Redrum or Red Rum may refer to:

Media
 Redrum, a 2022 Bangladeshi crime thriller film
 Redrum, a 2018 Indian Hindi-language psychological thriller film
 Redrum, a 2007 film starring American actress Jill Marie Jones
 Redrum, a plot element of the 1980 psychological horror film The Shining

Music
 Redrum (band), a Japanese indie rock band
 "Redrum" (Era Istrefi song), a song recorded by Kosovo Albanian singer Era Istrefi
 "Redrum" (Sorana and David Guetta song), 2022 single by Romanian singer Sorana and French disc jockey David Guetta
 "Redrum", the third song from Esham's 2000 compilation album Bootleg: From the Lost Vault, Vol. 1
 "Redrum", the third song from Skepta's 2019 album Ignorance Is Bliss

Television
 Redrum, a 2013–2015 series formerly broadcast by Investigation Discovery

Episodes
 "Red Rum", a first-season episode of the American drama television series The Mentalist
 "Redrum", a seventh-season episode of American procedural forensics crime drama television series CSI: Crime Scene Investigation
 "Redrum" (The X-Files), the sixth episode of the eighth season of the American science fiction television series The X-Files

Other
 Commodore Redrum, musician performing with American heavy metal band Swashbuckle
 Red Rum (1965–1995), a champion Thoroughbred steeplechaser
 Redrum, an installation by Finnish architect Marco Casagrande